Barnet Council could refer to:

Barnet London Borough Council, created in 1965
Barnet Rural District Council, renamed Elstree in 1941
Barnet Urban District Council, abolished in 1965
East Barnet Urban District Council, abolished in 1965
Friern Barnet Urban District Council, abolished in 1965